John Borland (born 25 July 1951) is a Scottish retired amateur football inside forward who played in the Scottish League for Queen's Park. He was capped by Scotland at amateur level.

References

Scottish footballers
Scottish Football League players
Queen's Park F.C. players
Association football inside forwards
Scotland amateur international footballers
1951 births
Living people
Footballers from Glasgow